Felice Carena (13 August 1879 – 10 June 1966) was an Italian painter.

Biography

Born at Cumiana, he studied in the Turin's Accademia Albertina, where he attended symbolist poets such as Arturo Graf and Giovanni Cena. In 1906 he moved to Rome and in 1912 he exhibited his works at the Biennale di Venezia. In 1913–1915 he began to be influenced by the style of Cézanne and Matisse; in the World War I period Carena lived in Anticoli Corrado, a hamlet outside Rome.

In 1922 he created in Rome an art school and, two years later, he began to teach in the Florence Academy. In 1945 he moved to Venice, where he lived for the rest of his life.

Painters who studied under Carena include Giuseppe Capogrossi.

External links
Biography at Anticoli Corrado museum website 
 A tribute to Felice Carena with photos and last exhibition

1879 births
1966 deaths
People from the Province of Turin
19th-century Italian painters
Italian male painters
20th-century Italian painters
Accademia Albertina alumni
Artists from Venice
19th-century Italian male artists
20th-century Italian male artists
Cumiana